Lamprozela is genus of moths of the Heliozelidae family. It was described by Edward Meyrick in 1916.

Species
 Lamprozela desmophanes
 Lamprozela metadesmia

References

Heliozelidae
Adeloidea genera